Borm or Barm may refer to:
 Börm, Germany
 Borm-e Sabz, Kohgiluyeh and Boyer-Ahmad Province, Iran
 Borm-e Shir, Kohgiluyeh and Boyer-Ahmad Province, Iran
 Borm, Lorestan, Iran
 Barm, Semnan, Iran